Neurophyseta ustalis is a moth in the family Crambidae. It was described by Francis Walker in 1865. It is found in India.

References

Moths described in 1865
Musotiminae